The County of Lytton is a county (a cadastral division) in the Darling Downs region of Queensland, Australia. It was named and bounded by the Governor in Council on 7 March 1901 under the Land Act 1897.

Parishes
Lytton is divided into parishes, as listed below:

References

Lytton

External links